Elias Martin  (8 March 1739 – 25 January 1818) was a Swedish genre, history, and landscape painter and engraver from Stockholm. He is known for his watercolour paintings of Stockholm, and his landscape oil paintings that feature romantic lighting effects. Nationalencyklopedin describes him as Sweden's "first great landscape painter".

Early life
Martin's father was a carpenter and wanted his son to work in carpentry. Martin, however, was more interested in art, and decided to become an apprentice of the painter F.C. Schultz. During his time with Schultz, he was hired by the naval architect Fredrik Henrik af Chapman to design ship ornaments. This job led to an acquaintanceship with Augustin Ehrensvärd, a lieutenant colonel in the artillery and a painter, who brought Martin to the sea fortress of Sveaborg and encouraged him to pursue his painting.

Martin stayed at Sveaborg for two years and painted several paintings of the fortress and its surroundings under the supervision of Ehrensvärd. He also gave drawing lessons to the garrison officers and Ehrensvärd's son, Carl August Ehrensvärd.

In May 1766, Martin traveled to Le Havre and Paris in France where he mostly worked on his own. He tried to copy the style of François Boucher, but quickly realized that it did not suit him. Martin was not a follower of French classicism, and therefore moved to London in 1770. He may have briefly visited Rome before his move.

In England, Martin spent most of his time on landscape painting, receiving inspiration from Claude Lorrain and the English landscape school. He painted several paintings in this style, but also experimented with portraits, genre paintings, and history paintings.

Career
Among Martin's most famous works from this time are the paintings he made in the Bodleian Library in Oxford. These include Britomartis befriande Amoret ur trollqvinnans våld (English: Britomart frees Amor from the witch's possession; based on Edmund Spenser's epic poem The Faerie Queene) and Arkebiskop Langton, som af konungen erhåller en handling.

Martin gained a good reputation in England for his paintings, and he became an Associate of the Royal Academy. In 1781 he earned a membership at the Royal Swedish Academy of Arts, and a year later he traveled to Sweden. He went ashore in Helsingborg and passed through Lund, Karlskrona, and Kalmar before arriving in Stockholm. On his journey he saw many views that he later depicted in watercolour and oil paintings. Martin stayed in the capital of Sweden for several years, diligently working on paintings, drawings, and engravings that people ordered. Some of his foremost paintings from this period include Midsommarfest, Hertigens af Småland döpelseakt i slottskapellet (1782), Gustaf III:s och hertig Fredrik Adolfs besök i Målare- och bildhuggare-akademien, Uppsala (1784; given to Pope Pius VI), Gripsholm (1784), Engelska parken vid Drottningholm (1785), Stockholm från Mosebacke (1786–87).

In 1788 Martin once again traveled to England, where he first stayed in London and then in Bath. In the summer of 1791 he was recalled to Sweden by King Gustav III. He remained there until his death. During his final years in Stockholm Martin produced several engravings and paintings, primarily depicting landscapes, in watercolour and oils. He also became an art teacher.

Martin died in Stockholm on 25 January 1818. His younger brother, Johan Fredrik Martin, was also a painter.

Works

References

Sources
 
 
 Attribution: This article contains content from the 1886 edition of Nordisk familjebok, a Swedish encyclopedia now in the public domain.

External links 

 
 Profile on Royal Academy of Arts Collections

18th-century Swedish painters
18th-century Swedish male artists
Swedish male painters
19th-century Swedish painters
1739 births
1818 deaths
History painters
Swedish landscape painters
Swedish watercolourists
Associates of the Royal Academy
Age of Liberty people
19th-century Swedish male artists